Eagle Air was an airline based in Tanzania. It offered scheduled flights within the country, including from Dar-es-Salaam to Mafia Island. In 2001, the company announced plans to expand its services to additional provincial and rural communities throughout Tanzania. The company was defunct by 2002.

References

Defunct airlines of Tanzania